The 1957 Warwick and Leamington by-election was fought on 7 March 1957 when the incumbent Conservative MP, the ex-Prime Minister Sir Anthony Eden, retired from Parliament.  The seat was retained by the Conservative candidate John Hobson.

Result

References

By-elections to the Parliament of the United Kingdom in Warwickshire constituencies
Warwick and Leamington by-election
Warwick and Leamington by-election
Warwick and Leamington by-election
20th century in Warwickshire